Church of the Presentation of the Blessed Virgin Mary (Crkva Vavedenje Presvete Bogorodice) was a Serbian Orthodox Church located in the village of , in the municipality of Peja, Kosovo and Metohija.

History and location 
The church in Belo Polje was dedicated to the Presentation of the Virgin and was located at the foot of the mountain range Pleš-Koprivnik, on the right side of the small river Kamenica-Sušica, south of the town Peja. In the Charter of Stefan of Dečani from the 14th century there is a source claiming that on that place once stood the original church. There is also a marble tombstone with an inscription from the 14th century, subsequently incorporated into the floor of the church.

The older church was violated during the Turkish occupation of the area. A newer, current, is built with the material support of Russian Empress Maria Alexandrovna in the period 1866-1868. Its construction is supported by the efforts of Dečani Archimandrite Kiril Andrejević, residents of the city and esnaf associations from Peć and Skadar.

The destruction of the church in 1999 
The church and the village were burned down in 1999, windows shattered, furniture, iconostasis and liturgical items broken. The doors were damaged on both sides. On this time, murals suffered the greatest damage, now covered with a thick layer of soot and grime. The church was partially restored at the end of 2003, but in March 2004 the church and the village were burned again.

See also 
 Destroyed Serbian heritage in Kosovo

References

Sources

External links 
 The list of destroyed and desecrated churches in Kosovo and Metohija June-October 1999 (Списак уништених и оскрнављених цркава на Косову и Метохији јун-октобар 1999)
 The list of destroyed, burned and demolished churches  (Spisak uništenih, spaljenih i demoliranih crkava), svetosavlje.org

Religious buildings and structures in Peja
Serbian Orthodox church buildings in Kosovo
Destroyed churches in Kosovo
19th-century Serbian Orthodox church buildings
1868 establishments in Europe
Cultural heritage of Kosovo